Thomas Kail (born January 30, 1978) is an American theatre director, known for directing the Off-Broadway and Broadway productions of Lin-Manuel Miranda's musicals In the Heights and Hamilton, garnering the 2016 Tony Award for Best Direction of a Musical for the latter. Kail was awarded the Kennedy Center Honor in 2018.

Personal life 
Kail grew up in Alexandria, Virginia and graduated from Sidwell Friends School in 1995 and subsequently from Wesleyan University in 1999. He remains good friends with Lin-Manuel Miranda, with whom he co-created the freestyle hip-hop group Freestyle Love Supreme. Kail is Jewish.

Kail began a relationship with theatre actress Angela Christian in 2006; they divorced in 2019. In December 2019, it was announced that he was engaged to Fosse/Verdon actress Michelle Williams, who was expecting their first child together; they married in March 2020. Their son, Hart, was born by June that year. In May 2022, Williams revealed she is pregnant with their second child together.

Kail and Williams are raising their two young children with Judaism, and Williams (who is not Jewish) is studying the religion herself. Williams also has a daughter from a previous relationship with the late actor Heath Ledger.

Career 
After graduating from Wesleyan University, Kail became assistant stage manager at New Jersey's American Stage Company.

Kail directed the 24 Hour Plays benefit performances in 2007 and 2008, where "6 short plays are written, rehearsed, directed, and performed in 24 hours." In 2007, he directed Julia Jordan's A Bus Stop Play, and Beau Willimon's Zusammenbruch in 2008. Both shows played at the American Airlines Theatre on Broadway.

Kail directed the hit Broadway musical In the Heights, which garnered him a Tony Award nomination for Best Direction of a Musical. The musical premiered on Broadway, starting in previews on February 14, 2008, with an official opening on March 9, 2008, at the Richard Rodgers Theatre.

Kail directed Broke-ology, which played from October 5, 2009, to November 22, 2009, at the Lincoln Center Theater Off-Broadway. This play garnered Kail an AUDELCO Award nomination for Best Director of a Dramatic Production. Kail also staged the world premiere at the Williamstown Theatre Festival. In 2009, Kail also directed the New York City Center's Encores! production of the musical The Wiz.

Kail directed Eric Simonson's play Lombardi, based on Green Bay Packers coach Vince Lombardi through a week in the 1965 season, as he attempts to lead his team to the championship. Lombardi officially premiered on Broadway at the Circle in the Square Theatre on October 21, 2010.

He then directed the Off-Broadway run of Nathan Louis Jackson's When I Come to Die, which ran in January and February 2011.

Kail reunited with Lombardi playwright Eric Simonson on Magic/Bird, a new play chronicling the intertwined life stories of basketball Hall of Famers Larry Bird and Earvin "Magic" Johnson. The play premiered on Broadway at the Longacre Theatre on March 21, 2012, in previews, officially on April 11, 2012, and closed on May 12, 2012. Kail directed, with the cast that featured Kevin Daniels as "Magic" Johnson and Tug Coker as Larry Bird.

Kail continued his collaboration with Lin-Manuel Miranda, directing the musical Hamilton in 2015, both Off-Broadway and on Broadway, for which he won a Tony Award.

Kail directed Grease: Live for Paramount Television, screened live on Fox on January 31, 2016; the world premiere of Dry Powder with Hank Azaria, Claire Danes, John Krasinski and Sanjit De Silva which ran from March to May 2016 at The Public Theater in New York City; and Tiny Beautiful Things, also at The Public, from November to December 2016.

On July 5, 2018, FX announced an eight-episode order for a limited-series entitled Fosse/Verdon, with Sam Rockwell playing the role of Bob Fosse and Michelle Williams playing the role of Gwen Verdon. On October 25, 2018, it was reported that Thomas Kail would direct at least four of the series' eight episodes and he would go on to direct a total of five episodes. Kail was nominated for Outstanding Directing – Movies for Television and Limited Series by the Directors Guild of America for the episode "Nowadays."

Credits

Film and television

Theater

Awards and nominations

References

External links 

American theatre directors
Broadway theatre directors
Wesleyan University alumni
Living people
American hip hop musicians
American freestyle musicians
American television directors
Jewish American musicians
Kennedy Center honorees
People from Alexandria, Virginia
Primetime Emmy Award winners
Tony Award winners
1978 births